Corallomycetella elegans is one of the two recognized species in the fungus genus Corallomycetella. It is a parasite of rubber, cacao and tea trees.

See also 
 List of cacao diseases
 List of tea diseases

References

External links 
 mycobank.org

Nectriaceae
Fungi described in 2013
Cacao diseases
Tea diseases
Fungal tree pathogens and diseases